Lakeside Village is an unincorporated community in Cumberland County, in the U.S. state of Virginia.

References

Unincorporated communities in Virginia
Unincorporated communities in Cumberland County, Virginia